Grinnell Township is a township in Gove County, Kansas, USA.  As of the 2000 census, its population was 480.

Geography
According to the USGS, it contains one cemetery, Zion Norwegian.

References
 USGS Geographic Names Information System (GNIS)

External links
 US-Counties.com
 City-Data.com

Townships in Gove County, Kansas
Townships in Kansas